Men's Giant Slalom World Cup 1981/1982

Calendar

Final point standings

In Men's Giant Slalom World Cup 1981/82 the best 5 results count.

Men's Giant Slalom Team Results

All points were shown including individuel deduction. bold indicate highest score - italics indicate race wins

References
 fis-ski.com

World Cup
FIS Alpine Ski World Cup men's giant slalom discipline titles